KABQ may refer to:

 The ICAO code for Albuquerque International Sunport
 KABQ (AM), a radio station (1350 AM) licensed to serve Albuquerque, New Mexico, United States
 KABQ-FM, a radio station (95.1 FM) licensed to serve Corrales, New Mexico
 KKTH, a radio station (104.7 FM) licensed to serve Bosque Farms, New Mexico, which held the call sign KABQ-FM from 2007 to 2021
 KTEG, a radio station (104.1 FM) licensed to serve Santa Fe, New Mexico, which held the call sign KABQ-FM from 2003 to 2007

See also
 QAB, another name of Ryukyu Asahi Broadcasting